"The Stranger" is an essay by Georg Simmel, originally written as an excursus to a chapter dealing with the sociology of space in his book Soziologie. In this essay, Simmel introduced the notion of "the stranger" as a unique sociological category. He differentiates the stranger both from the "outsider" who has no specific relation to a group and from the "wanderer" who comes today and leaves tomorrow. The stranger, he says, comes today and stays tomorrow. The stranger is a member of the group in which he lives and participates and yet remains distant from other – "native" – members of the group. In comparison to other forms of social distance and difference (such as class, gender, and even ethnicity) the distance of the stranger has to do with his "origins". The stranger is perceived as extraneous to the group and even though he is in constant relation to other group members; his "distance" is more emphasized than his "nearness". As one subsequent interpreter of the concept put it, the stranger is perceived as being in the group but not of the group.

In the excursus, Simmel briefly touches upon the consequences of occupying such a unique position for the stranger as well as the potential effects of the presence of the stranger on other group members. Most notably, Simmel suggests that because of their peculiar positions in the group, strangers often carry out special tasks that the other members of the group are either incapable or unwilling to carry out. For example, especially in pre-modern societies, most strangers were involved in trade activities. Also, because of their distance from local factions, they might also be employed as arbitrators and even judges.

The concept of the stranger has found relatively wide usage in the subsequent sociological literature and it is utilized by many sociologists ranging from Robert Park to Zygmunt Bauman. Like most widely used sociological concepts, however, there has been some controversy regarding its application and interpretation.

References 

1908 essays
Sociology essays